"Jewels and Bullets" is the second single from the album Hi Fi Way by the Australian rock band You Am I. It was released in 1995 and reached number 93 on the Australian ARIA singles chart, and number 93 in the 1995 Triple J Hottest 100.

The Robbie Douglas-Turner directed music video won the ARIA Award for Best Video at the ARIA Music Awards of 1995.

Track listing
 "Jewels and Bullets" – 2:58
 "Jaimme's Got a Gal" (Remix) – 3:30
 "Young Man Blues" (live) – 5:01

Tracks 1 and 2 (Rogers). Track 3 (Allison).

The "Jaimme's Got a Gal" remix features strings and additional guitar and percussion.

"Young Man Blues" is a cover version of the Mose Allison song brought to prominence by The Who. It was recorded live at Memorial Stadium in Seattle on August 13, 1994, while supporting Soundgarden on a national tour.

Charts

References

1995 singles
You Am I songs
Songs written by Tim Rogers (musician)
1995 songs
Songs written by Rusty Hopkinson
Songs written by Andy Kent